Tithonia rotundifolia, the red sunflower or Mexican sunflower, is a plant in the family Asteraceae, which is native to the warmer and moister parts of North America.

Range
It occurs in Florida, Louisiana, Mexico, Central America and the West Indies. Outside its native region it is sometimes grown as an ornamental and has become naturalized in some of these locales. In Africa it has been recorded up to an altitude of 1,580 m above sea level.

Description
Plants are perennial in the native habitat, up to 4 m tall with orange or red flowers. In USDA zones cooler than Zone 10 it is an annual. The flowers are used by many insects as a nectar source including migrating monarch butterflies.  Leaves, despite the epithet, are deltoid to lanceolate, occasionally lobed.

Synonyms
Tithonia rotundifolia (Mill.) S.F. Blake, Contr. Gray Herb. 52: 41. 1917.
Tagetes rotundifolia Miller, Gard. Dict. ed. 8, Tagetes no. 4. 1768.
Helianthus speciosus Hook., Bot. Mag. 61: t. 3295. 1834.
Tithonia speciosa (Hook.) Griseb., Cat. pl. Cub. 155. 1866.
Tithonia vilmoriniana Pamp.Tithonia vilmoriniana Pamp.</ref>

References

Heliantheae
Flora of Mexico
Garden plants of Central America
Flora of Florida
Flora of Louisiana
Flora of Central America
Flora of Cuba
Flora without expected TNC conservation status